Julio César Toresani (5 December 1967 – 22 April 2019) was an Argentine football midfielder and coach.

Club career 
Known as El Huevo ("The Egg"), Toresani played as a right midfielder and was known for his rough playing style. Toresani started his professional career in 1986 at Unión de Santa Fe, a club from his native city. After playing with the club for three years, he moved to the Instituto, where he played for only a year, returning to Unión in 1990. In 1991, Toresani signed with River Plate, playing for four years with the team. In 1996, he moved to Club Atlético Colón (Unión rivals) and in the following year, Toresani signed with Boca Juniors (River Plate's rival). In 1998, the midfielder moved to another Argentinian traditional football team, the Independiente. After one season with them, Toresani moved back to Cólon and then, in 2001, went to play at the Chilean club, Audax Italiano. He returned to Argentina and to Cólon in 2002 and then moved to Patronato where he retired in 2004.

He played for both teams of two sets of rivals: Boca Juniors and River Plate, as well as Colón de Santa Fe and Unión de Santa Fe. He was among the few players to have played for three of the biggest teams in Argentina, having played for River Plate, Boca Juniors and Independiente.

Managerial career 
As a coach, Toresani started his career at San Martín de San Juan where he managed the team at the 2005/2006 season. Toresani then went to Colón where he coached the team for only four matches at the beginning of the 2006/2007 season. In 2007, Toresani took over Aldosivi from Mar del Plata, a team which he managed until mid-October of that year, when he was dismissed from his duties. In January 2009, Toresani agreed to relocate to La Paz to be the manager of Bolivian popular team The Strongest. On 31 May 2009, the club announced the rupture of relations with Toresani, after he decided to resign from his responsibilities. He worked for Ecuadorian side LDU Loja in 2015. He was the head coach for Uruguayan club Rampla Juniors between mid-November 2018 and the end of February 2019, when he was fired.

Death
On 22 April 2019, Toresani was found dead at his house. The authorities believe that he committed suicide. According to several sources, Toresani was depressed due to being unemployed and divorcing from his wife. In the last few months, he lived apart from his family and children. His death caused commotion in Argentina, with several athletes, clubs and former teammates lamenting his death.

Titles

References

External links
 
 
 
 

1967 births
2019 deaths
Argentine footballers
Footballers from Santa Fe, Argentina
Association football midfielders
Argentine Primera División players
Unión de Santa Fe footballers
Instituto footballers
Club Atlético River Plate footballers
Club Atlético Colón footballers
Boca Juniors footballers
Club Atlético Independiente footballers
Primera Nacional players
Chilean Primera División players
Audax Italiano footballers
Torneo Argentino B players
Club Atlético Patronato footballers
Argentine expatriate footballers
Argentine expatriate sportspeople in Chile
Expatriate footballers in Chile
Argentine football managers
San Martín de San Juan managers
Club Atlético Colón managers
Aldosivi managers
The Strongest managers
Sportivo Italiano managers
Textil Mandiyú managers

Club Real Potosí managers
Rampla Juniors managers
Argentine expatriate football managers
Argentine expatriate sportspeople in Bolivia
Expatriate football managers in Bolivia
Argentine expatriate sportspeople in Ecuador
Expatriate football managers in Ecuador
Argentine expatriate sportspeople in Uruguay
Expatriate football managers in Uruguay
Suicides by hanging in Argentina
2019 suicides
L.D.U. Loja managers